Min Saw O (also known as Jalal Shah; 1456–1515) was king of Arakan for six months in 1515. He was a brother of King Salingathu (r. 1494–1502). He was put on the throne by the ministers of the court who had beheaded his grandnephew King Gazapati. Saw O died only after six months of reign in July 1515.

References

Bibliography
 

Monarchs of Mrauk-U
1456 births
1515 deaths
16th century in the Mrauk-U Kingdom
16th-century Burmese monarchs